Enteles vigorsii is a weevil in the Curculionidae family, which is found on the east coast of Australia.

These weevils have been found in the reproductive structures of cycads and are thought to assist in their pollination.

The species was first described by Leonard Gyllenhaal in 1837, who authored the description within Carl Johan Schönherr's 1837  tome on the Curculionidae.

Further reading

References

External links
Enteles vigorsii: images & occurrence data from Atlas of Living Australia

Curculionidae

Insects of Australia

Taxa named by Leonard Gyllenhaal
Insects described in 1837